FK Tachov is a Czech football club located in the town of Tachov in the Plzeň Region. It currently plays in the Bohemian Football League, which is the third level of domestic football competition.

In 2009, Tachov reached the second round of the 2009–10 Czech Cup, where they lost to 1. FC Karlovy Vary, 16–15 on penalties. The club set an attendance record in September 2015, as 2,850 spectators watched the Czech Cup third round match against Viktoria Plzeň, a game which finished 2–0 to the visitors.

References

External links
 Official website 

Football clubs in the Czech Republic
Tachov District